Autistic catatonia or catatonic breakdown is a disorder that affects roughly 10 percent of all adults with autism spectrum disorder and intellectual disabilities. Most are not severely affected but a few exhibit stupor and severe excitement, which is the most extreme form of the disorder. Full expression of excitement could be a sign of comorbid bipolar disorder but more research is needed.

The disorder is associated with more than 40 symptoms, but some overlap with those of autism spectrum disorder, making diagnosing difficult even for a seasoned professional. In a few cases, stupor and hyperactivity can continue for weeks or even months. During the excitement phase individuals show combativeness and can have delusions and hallucinations and can also pose a danger to themselves or others and can make marked destruction of property. In the later stages of medium and even more in the severe (and, if left untreated, lethal) state they will also experience autonomic instability.

Childhood schizophrenia increases the risk for autistic catatonia later in life dramatically. There seems to be a common font of brain pathology for psychosis, catatonia and autism.

Symptoms

List of symptoms that has been observed in those with autistic catatonia:

Treatment

The psycho-ecological approach considers the individual's profile of autism, identifies the underlying causes behind their catatonia, and formulates support strategies. These strategies vary depending on the individual and their difficulties.

History
In the 19th century the psychiatrist Karl Ludwig Kahlbaum observed several symptoms of the disorder. Among them were stupor, mutism, excitement, hyperactivity, posing, negativism, rigidity, waxy flexibility and automatic obedience, stereotypies, tics, grimacing, echo-phenomenon, and self-harming.

Also marbling of the skin, profuse sweating, deviation of the pupils and odd reaction to light were considered catatonic phenomenons.

During most of the 20th century catatonia was regarded as schizophrenic in its nature, but towards the end of the century it was more commonly observed in those with bipolar disorder and other mood disorders. Now only 15 percent of those with catatonia are considered to have schizophrenia.

See also

 Catatonia
 Autism
 Pathological Demand Avoidance

References

Further reading

External links

Autism